Philipp Lukas (born December 4, 1979) is an Austrian former professional ice hockey player and current Head Coach of Black Wings Linz of the ICE Hockey League (ICEHL). He formerly Captained the EHC Black Wings Linz of the then Austrian Hockey League (EBEL) for 10 seasons.

Lukas was a long-time member of the Austria men's national ice hockey team who has participated at the 2000, 2001, 2002, 2004, 2007, and 2011 IIHF World Championships.

He is the brother of ice hockey player Robert Lukas. The two played extensively together through their career with the Black Wings.

References

External links

1979 births
Austrian ice hockey forwards
EHC Black Wings Linz players
Living people
VEU Feldkirch players
Ice hockey people from Vienna